Coconut Hotel is an album originally recorded in 1967 by the American avant rock band Red Krayola. The intent was for it to be the band's second album after the release of The Parable of Arable Land, but it was rejected and shelved indefinitely by International Artists. Coconut Hotel would not hit stores till 1995 when it was finally issued by Drag City.

Background

In an interview with Ritchie Unterberger, Mayo Thompson said:

Recording
For Coconut Hotel, Mayo Thompson, Steve Cunningham and Frederick Barthelme returned to Andrus studio in Houston.

Mayo Thompson commented on the recording process: "It was done in a slightly more leisurely way, but we recorded all live in stereo, a pair of matched condenser microphones... There's no plan... The development of it is not in the usual musical way—there's not a melodic development, there's not a rhythmic development, there's not an intensifying of the dynamic strategy or anything."

Music
The album contains 36 one second pieces, the second track "Water Pour" consists of a two-minute piece that is played twice, Mayo Thompson said this was in reference to a performance habit of Mozart.

Steve Cunningham elaborated on how Coconut Hotel was a natural progression from The Parable of Arable Land in the 2nd issue of Mother: Houston's Rock Magazine (1968):- "It is definitely a natural progression. We feel that we are now doing the right thing, having in the past done likewise."

Reception 

Richie Unterberger of AllMusic, wrote: "This has so little commercial potential that it makes Zappa's Lumpy Gravy sound like AM radio fodder" also adding, "It's totally uncompromising, and rather wearisome, to be honest. It's like nothing else that nominally 'rock' groups were doing in 1967."

Track listing

Personnel 

 Red Krayola

 Rick Barthelme – drums, production
 Steve Cunningham – bass guitar, production
 Mayo Thompson – guitar, vocals, production

 Technical

 Walt Andrus – recording
 Les Blank – photography

References

External links 
 

1967 albums
1995 albums
Drag City (record label) albums
Red Krayola albums